Richard Ulrich is a former American football coach. He was the 15th head football coach at Adams State College—now known as Adams State University—in Alamosa, Colorado and he held that position for the 1981 season. His coaching record at Adams State was 3–5–1.

Head coaching record

References

Year of birth missing (living people)
Living people
Adams State Grizzlies football coaches
Rocky Mountain Battlin' Bears football coaches